Safavi is a Persian surname, best known as the surname of the royal family of the Safavid dynasty.

Etymology
Some have argued that Safavi is a cognate of the word "Safaviyeh". And that "Safa" is a cognate of the word Sufi. "Safavi" is an adjective, created for the name "Safi". Translated to English, "Safavi" would correspond roughly to "Safi-ish" or "Safidian" "Safavi" is the correct Persian language reference to "Safi", the name of Sheikh Safi-ad-din Ardabili. Similarly we speak of "Edwardian", when making a reference to the era affiliated with king Edward VII. Sheikh Safi's descendants have been going by this name for 770 years. There are numerous bearers of the name "Safavi" thriving in modern-day Iran, who claim descent from Sheikh Safi or any of his royal heirs.

Many Safavis can still be found in East Azerbaijan, Ardebil Province and Isfahan Province – the former capital of the Safavid dynasty – and can also be found in Mashhad, Razavi Khorasan province. Safavis can also be found all across Iran. Another branch of the family is found in South Lebanon under the names Safa and Jaber, a branch of the Safa family.

Safavid
The term "Safavid", as in Safavid dynasty (of which Sheikh Safi is the Eponym), is likewise referred to as "Safavi" by Persian speakers. The "d" at the end of "Safavid" was added by the principle of analogy with the Greek-derived names of several ancient dynasties, such as the Achaemenid dynasty and the Sassanid dynasty, based on the oblique cases of the Greek names. The English adjective "Safavid" and the name "Safavids" for the dynasty, and the corresponding forms in many European languages, are therefore based on a redundant application of adjective-forming rules.

The names "Safavid/Safavids" are well-established in the English language, however, and have become legitimate terms. When added to a Shah's name however, the original "Safavi", without the "d" at the end, must always be retained, e.g., Shah Ismail I Safavi.

Notable people with the surname Safavi

 Aga Syed Mustafa Al-Moosavi Al-Safavi (1918–2002), was a Kashmiri Shia Muslim cleric, Islamic Jurist, Islamic scholar, philanthropist 
 Aga Syed Yusuf Al-Moosavi Al-Safavi (1904–1982), was a Kashmiri religious scholar and leader of Shia Muslims; founder of Anjuman Sharie Shian
 Ali Mirza Safavi (?–1494), was the penultimate head of the Safavid order
 Azarmi Dukht Safavi (born 1948), Indian poet
 Bahram Mirza Safavi (1517–1549), was a Safavid prince
 Hamza Mirza Safavi (1532–1595/1596), fourth Safavid Shah
 Haydar Mirza Safavi (1554–1576), was a Safavid prince
 Isa Khan Safavi, was a Safavid prince
 Ismail Mirza Safavi (1537–1577), Shah of Persia
 Khvajeh Ali Safavi (?–1427), leader of the Safavid order
 Kourosh Safavi (born 1956), Iranian linguist, translator and university professor
 Mirza Badi-uz-Zaman Safavi (?–1659), was a prince of the Safavid dynasty
 Navvab Safavi (1924–1956), Iranian Shia cleric and founder of the Fada'iyan-e Islam group
 Nazi Safavi (born 1967), Iranian writer
 Razia Begum Safavi (1700–1776), Safavid princess and the royal consort of Shah Nader Shah 
 Sam Mirza Safavi (1517–1566), was a Safavid prince
 Yahya Rahim Safavi (born 1952), Iranian military commander

See also 
 Safavid family tree

References 

Persian-language surnames
Surnames
Iranian families